Sohil is a name used across india. The root word is ''soheil’’ or “sohail”.

Often « Sohil and Soheil » get confused but both the words are totally different. « Sohil » is commonly used in India.

As a variant spelling of Sohail, it refers to Canopus, the second brightest star in the Sky, this is an arabic and persian connotation.

References

See also 
 Suhail
 Sahil (disambiguation)
 Sohan

Masculine given names